P.R.O.B.E. is a series of direct-to-video science-fiction films mostly written by Mark Gatiss and produced by BBV Productions. It was the first live-action Doctor Who spin-off series.

The series features Caroline John as Liz Shaw, working for the Preternatural Research Bureau. Many former Doctor Who actors, including former Doctors Jon Pertwee, Peter Davison, Colin Baker and Sylvester McCoy, appear in the series playing different roles. (Due to licensing restrictions, no overt reference to The Doctor is permitted.) Doctor Who alumna Louise Jameson co-stars with Caroline John in the original four films, as Patricia Haggard.

Originally released on VHS, the series was not widely available on video. When an interviewer commented to series author Mark Gatiss that he had never seen the series, Gatiss replied "No, and you never will. One, they're not available. And two, I forbid it. Christ, for all I knew, they were the only things I would ever get to make. And I learned a frightening amount from working on them." The four original films were released on DVD on 3 March 2012 exclusive to Galaxy 4 shop with a 12 rating.

A fifth film, written and directed by Bill Baggs, was released 20 April 2015 with Hazel Burrows taking over as Liz Shaw.

In 2020 the P.R.O.B.E. series was revived by Arcbeatle Press, starting with the release of Shadows of Doubt. Under Arcbeatle Press the series made the transition to the prose format.

The Zero Imperative (1994)

The Zero Imperative was released direct-to-video in January 1994 by BBV.

Synopsis
Former UNIT luminary Liz Shaw and her assistant Bayliss are investigating a series of bizarre murders, all committed near a soon-to-be-closed psychiatric hospital.

When the hospital is unexpectedly reprieved by rich Industrialist Peter Russell events seem to move out of Liz's control. Are the incumbent director of the clinic, Doctor Dove and his predecessor Doctor O'Kane harbouring the killer? What is the centuries-old horror hidden in the grounds?

And what exactly is the secret of room zero?

Cast
 Liz Shaw – Caroline John
 Patricia Haggard – Louise Jameson
 Louise Bayliss – Linda Lusardi
 Dr. Jeremiah O'Kane – Jon Pertwee
 Dr. Colin Dove – Sylvester McCoy
 Peter Russell – Colin Baker
 Dr. William Bruffin – Mark Gatiss
 Patient Zero – David Terence
 Dr. Beatrice Hearst – Nicola Fulljames
 Dr. Gilchrist – Patricia Merrick
 Cummings – Jonathan Rigby
 P.R.O. – Sophie Aldred
 Orderly – Simon Messingham
 Orderly – Alexander Kirk
 Orderly - Robert John Preston
 Patient One – Peter Davison
 Daniel – Bill Baggs
 Boy's Voice – Daniel Mills

Trivia
This film is occasionally listed as part of BBV's series The Stranger, although it is a standalone production. The only apparent connection besides production company is that Colin Baker stars in both.

The Devil of Winterborne (1995)

The Devil of Winterborne was released direct-to-video in January 1995 by BBV.

Synopsis
When P.R.O.B.E. are summoned to investigate the savage murder of retired headmaster Mr. Whittaker and his dog, Liz Shaw is disturbed to find evidence of a satanic ritual near the scene of the crime. The trail leads of deceit and corruption extends to the current occupants of nearby Winterborne School, where it appears that someone is determined to cover up an ancient secret – at any cost. With another animal having bit the dust, the current headteacher accused of murdering a pupil, and one of the school's oldest employees having been stabbed with a knife, Liz finds herself under increasing pressure from all sides to produce results, especially with P.R.O.B.E. under threat from within – and the death toll mounting. However, a shocking revelation from headteacher Gavin Purcell reveals that The Devil of Winterborne is at large – and only Liz can stop it.

Cast

 Liz Shaw – Caroline John
 Patricia Haggard – Louise Jameson
 D.I. Burke – Terry Molloy
 Brian Rutherford – Geoffrey Beevers
 Mr. Wittaker – Geoffrey Beevers
 Gavin Purcell – Peter Davison

 Barbara Taploe – Charmian May
 Georgie – Mark Gatiss
 Christian – Daniel Matthews
 Andrew Powell – Reece Shearsmith
 Luke – Stephen Dolomore
 Cummings – Jonathan Rigby

Unnatural Selection (1996)

Unnatural Selection was released direct-to-video in October 1996 by BBV.

Synopsis
In 1975, the British Government quietly closed down a secret evolutionary project codenamed BEAGLE, ordering the destruction of all research materials.

Today, the horrific discovery of several oddly mutated bodies alerts Liz Shaw and P.R.O.B.E. to the fact that something is stalking the original site of project BEAGLE – something which may challenge the very nature of humanity itself!

With a crack security team at her disposal, Liz desperately attempts to track down the perverted results of the project.

But who or what is hunting whom?

Cast
Liz Shaw – Caroline John
Patricia Haggard – Louise Jameson
Julius Quilter – Charles Kay
Brian Rutherford – Geoffrey Beevers
Soldier – Stephen Bradshaw
Soldier – Keith Brooks
Alfred Emerson – Mark Gatiss
Col. Ackroyd – Alexander Kirk
Dr. Gilchrist – Patricia Merrick
Soldier – Mark Moore
Security Guard – George Murphy
Soldier – Gabriel Mykaj
Clare – Zoe Randall
Angela – Kathryn Rayner
Cummings – Jonathan Rigby
Dr. Dennis Lancaster – Simon Wolfe

Ghosts of Winterborne (1996)

Ghosts of Winterborne was released direct-to-video in November 1996 by BBV.

Synopsis
The Devil of Winterborne has only recently been exorcised by P.R.O.B.E.

But when the body of its last victim disappears, and a book of black magic spells is stolen from a local museum, Liz Shaw begins to wonder if the ghosts of the past have really been laid to rest.

Forced into an unholy alliance with the school's disgraced headmaster, Liz must fight not only her own warring emotions, but a festering evil that threatens to corrupt the Earth again after 100 years.

But how do you fight a shadow from hell?

Cast
Liz Shaw – Caroline John
Patricia Haggard – Louise Jameson
Gavin Purcell – Peter Davison
Christian – Daniel Matthews
Margaret Wyndham – Charmian May
Andrew Powell – Reece Shearsmith
Max – David Hankinson
Ian – Nathan Hamlett
Librarian – Alan Nicholas

Story Notes
 The end credits list Mrs. Wyndham's first name as Barbara, rather than her on-screen name of Margaret. However, Mrs. Wyndham's deceased twin sister, Ms. Taploe, was also named Barbara.
 Until the release of Zygon: When Being You Just isn't Enough in 2007, this was the only Doctor Who-related product to be given an 18 certificate although in 2012 Ghosts was re-rated 12.

When to Die (2015)

When to Die was released direct-to-video on 20 April 2015 by BBV.

Synopsis
Liz investigates the government execution of an immortal Corporal who 'no longer has a use'.

Cast
Liz Shaw - Hazel Burrows
Patricia Haggard - Georgette Ellison
Giles - Bill Baggs
Secretary of State for Defence - Matthew Ellison
Security Guard - Danni Fletcher
Josie Williams - Clare Groome
Receptionist - Kathrina Gwynne
Major Johnson - Neil Gwynne
Charlie Reynish - Ken Hann
Bennett - Marcus Kinsella
Soldier - Ruben Sanchez
Bosnian Diplomat - Brian Stansbridge
Corporal 7891Alpha - Peter Ward

Shadows of Doubt (2020)

Shadows of Doubt was released on YouTube on 28 April 2020 by Arcbeatle Press.

Synopsis
Giles fears for his team in light of the upcoming perihelion.

Cast
Giles - Bill Baggs

Case Files (2021 - present)

Case Files is a series of video diaries initially released on YouTube under the initial title P.R.O.B.E. Online starting 22 January 2021 by BBV Productions, later released exclusively to the BBV Productions website.

Episodes
Presented as Case File video-diary entries by main character Giles, often including illustrations and references to various Doctor Who-related media. On 16 April 2021, episodes became available on the official BBV website & on DVD 10 June 2021. This lists ordered per the DVD releases.

Volume 1

Out of the Shadows

Volume 2

Volume 3

Cast
 Giles - Bill Baggs
 Liz Shaw - Hazel Burrows
 Sir Andrew Williams - Simon Fisher-Becker
 Dr Lauren Anderson - Jo Castleton (archive footage)
 Soloman - Colin Baker (archive footage)
 Miss Brown - Nicola Bryant (archive footage)

Crew
Written by James Hornby & Bill Baggs
Script Editor: Lucy Wood-Ives & James Hornby
Art by Warren Lewis & James Lee
PROBE Theme: Mark Ayres
PROBE Logo: Lucas Kovacs
Editing/ Post-Production: Bill Baggs & Callum Brown

Audiobooks (2021 - present)

P.R.O.B.E. Audiobooks are a series of narrated short stories released on the BBV Productions website.

Short Stories
Short prose stories published by Arcbeatle Press

 "The Door We Forgot" (by James Hornby and James Wylder, 5 May 2020)
 "She Came From Another World!" (by James Wylder, 8 August 2020)

Anthologies

 Out of the Shadows (ed James Hornby & Genevieve Clovis, 12 October 2021)
 "Prologue" (James Wylder)
 "Preternatural Days" (James Hornby)
 "There, but Not Seen" (Kylie Leane)	
 "The 262" (Stuart Douglas)
 "How To Appear Human In Several Uneasy Lessons" (John Peel)
 "A Honeycomb of Souls" (James Wylder)
 "The Last Few Pages" (Hunter O'Connell)
 "The One That Got Away" (Steve Lyons)
 "The Forest in the Fog" (E Southern)
 "Nowhere Women" (James Wylder)
 "What Lurks in the Shadows" (James Hornby)
 "Out of the Box" (Aristide Twain)
 "Preternatural Nights" (James Hornby)
 True Origins (ed James Hornby & Jame Wyler, 8 January 2022)
 "Silver-Tongued Liars" (James Wylder)
 "A Worthy Successor" (James Hornby & James Wylder)
 "She Came From Another World!" (James Wylder)
 "9 to 5" (James Hornby)
 "What Happened in Manchester" (James Hornby)
 "The Door We Forgot" (James Wylder)
 "Broken Bonds" (James Hornby)
 "The Blue Scream of Death" (Tyche McPhee Letts)

References

External links

Bill & Ben Video
1990s fantasy films
1990s science fiction films
British science fiction films
Direct-to-video film series
Film spin-offs
UNIT stories
Works by Mark Gatiss
1990s English-language films